Akhil Sharma (born July 22, 1971) is an Indian-American author and professor of creative writing. His first published novel An Obedient Father won the 2001 Hemingway Foundation/PEN Award. His second, Family Life, won the 2015 Folio Prize and 2016 International Dublin Literary Award.

Early life
Born in Delhi, India, he immigrated to the United States when he was eight, and grew up in Edison, New Jersey, where he graduated from J.P. Stevens High School. Sharma described experiencing racism in school and in the city: "people cursing at us in the street, and being spat at at school." Sharma's teenage brother was in a pool accident that left him in a thirty-year coma, an incident that forms the basis of Sharma's semi-autobiographical novel, Family Life. Sharma studied at Princeton University, where he earned his B.A. in public policy at the Woodrow Wilson School. While there, he also studied under a succession of notable writers, including Russell Banks, Toni Morrison, Joyce Carol Oates, Paul Auster, John McPhee, and Tony Kushner. He then won a Stegner Fellowship to the writing program at Stanford, where he won two O. Henry Awards (1995 and 1997). He then attempted to become a screenwriter, but, disappointed with his fortunes, left to attend Harvard Law School.

Sharma went on to become an assistant professor in the creative writing MFA program at Rutgers University-Newark.

Career
Sharma has published stories in The New Yorker, The Atlantic Monthly, The Quarterly, Fiction, the Best American Short Stories anthology, and the O. Henry Award Winners anthology. His short story "Cosmopolitan" was anthologized in The Best American Short Stories 1998, and was also made into a 2003 film of the same name, which has appeared on the PBS series Independent Lens.

Sharma's first novel was An Obedient Father for which he won the 2001 Hemingway Foundation/PEN Award. Sharma's second novel, Family Life was published by W. W. Norton & Company in the U.S. and Faber and Faber in the U.K. in April 2014. The New York Times described the semi-autobiographical novel as "deeply unnerving and gorgeously tender at its core.". David Sedaris noted that "[e]very page is alive and surprising, proof of [Sharma’s] huge, unique talent." Sharma wrote about the 13 years it took to write Family Life in an essay on The New Yorker'''s website. Family Life won the 2015 Folio Prize for fiction and the 2016 International Dublin Literary Award.

He shares office space with the writers John Wray, Isaac Fitzgerald, and Alice Sola Kim. He and Wray had previously been part of an informal writing group that includes Gary Shteyngart, Suketu Mehta, and Ray Isle.

In July 2017, Norton published Sharma's collection of short stories, A Life of Adventure and Delight.

Personal life
Sharma and his first wife, Lisa Swanson, met in law school and married in 2001. They later divorced. In 2020, Sharma married Irish psychologist Christine Mulligan, with whom he has a daughter.

Bibliography

Fiction
Novels
 An Obedient Father (2000) 
 Family Life (2014)

Short stories

Non-fiction

Awards and honours
2001 PEN/Hemingway Award winner for An Obedient Father2001 Whiting Award winner for An Obedient Father2014 New York Magazine Ten Best Books of the Year selection for Family Life2014 New York Times Ten Best Books of the Year selection for Family Life 
2015 Folio Prize winner for Family Life2016 DSC Prize for South Asian Literature shortlist for Family Life2016 International Dublin Literary Award for Family Life''

References

External links

1971 births
Living people
21st-century American novelists
American male novelists
American male short story writers
American novelists of Indian descent
Harvard Law School alumni
Hemingway Foundation/PEN Award winners
Indian emigrants to the United States
J. P. Stevens High School alumni
People from Edison, New Jersey
The New Yorker people
Princeton School of Public and International Affairs alumni
21st-century American short story writers
21st-century American male writers
American short story writers of Asian descent
American writers of Indian descent